Drosera solaris is a species of sundew native to the highlands of Guyana. It is thought to be most closely related to Drosera felix and Drosera kaieteurensis.

References

solaris
Carnivorous plants of South America
Endemic flora of Guyana
Guayana Highlands
Plants described in 2007